Xiahe may refer to the following locations in China:

 Xiahe County (夏河县), Gannan Prefecture, Gansu
 Xiahe Township, Fujian (下河乡), in Yunxiao County
 Xiahe Township, Hebei (下河乡), in Quyang County
 Xiahe Township, Liaoning (峡河乡), in Fushun County
 Xiahe Township, Shandong (下河乡), in Zhanhua County